"I Miss You" is a song recorded by Icelandic musician Björk for her second studio album, Post (1995). It was released on 24 April 1995 by One Little Indian as the sixth and final single from the album. It is amongst her least well performing singles in the United Kingdom, but it hit number one on the US Billboard Hot Dance Club Play chart. The B-side "Karvel" was recorded in one of Björk's first sessions with Graham Massey in 1991; during which two other tracks were also recorded: "Army of Me" and "The Modern Things".

Background
The lyrics describe Björk already knowing who her perfect lover will be, even though she has not yet met him. Nine years later, the remastered version, as it appears on the release of the 2006 album Surrounded, features a newly recorded vocal take.

Critical reception
Larry Flick from Billboard commented, "The time has come for pop radio programmers to finally make room for Björk. This gem from her current collection, Telegram, shimmers with a spine-tinging pop/disco groove, fluttering flamenco guitars A la No Mercy, and deliciously spicy salsa piano lines. All the while, Björk warbles a wickedly contagious chorus in her distinctive vocal style. Radio needs to broaden its parameters and treat its listeners to this record. It could open the floodgates for a refreshing new phase in pop music." Chuck Campbell from Knoxville News Sentinel found that "Björk longs for her dream lover on "I Miss You", which glides on a smooth, tropical rhythm (with jittery enhancements for spice)." Dominic Pride from Music & Media wrote, "Trumpets and soaring, open-throated vocals evoke memories of Björk's former band the Sugarcubes, but Arabic-style drones and Middle-Eastern percussion betray her more recent ability to hoover up musical styles and make them her own. Showing no desire to compromise for mainstream radio acceptance, Björk's sound again challenges even her ardent fans." British magazine from Music Week named it Single of the Week and gave it five out of five, declaring it as "one of the strongest songs" on the Post album. David Sinclair from The Times said, "Typically bewitching number, accompanied here by a bewildering variety of remixes none of which betters the original."

Music video

The accompanying music video for "I Miss You" was directed by John Kricfalusi of Spümcø, best known for the Ren & Stimpy cartoons, which Björk admired. The animation was supervised by Erik Wiese and produced by Stephen Worth. Zeus Cervas, Ben Jones, Albert Lozano, Sanjay Patel, Chris Sauve, Jim Smith and Aaron Springer were amongst the animators who worked on the video.

The first edition of Telegraph, a fan magazine directed by Sjón, read: "To the horror of parents everywhere two of the most disturbed minds in show business (have) come together to make what they promise will be the silliest, most demoralising and, as some depraved souls will undoubtedly say, funniest music video ever!" The video has a surreal and humorous quality, with some sexual imagery.

Björk has red-coloured hair in both the animated and live parts of the video. One of Kricfalusi's characters, Jimmy the Idiot Boy (in which he was naked in some scenes and his private parts were removed), joins her during various parts of the video.

Another Kricfalusi character, George Liquor, makes a cameo in one scene. Also, Fred Flintstone makes a cameo in the scene of the bathroom. An edit was made of the video that covered Björk's breasts. The scene at the end of the music video showing Björk tearing an animated chicken in half was cut during showings on MTV.

When Björk saw the storyboards, she explained that Kricfalusi had "made [her] very cute", and was so pleased that she reportedly exclaimed, "It's like Christmas!" The video won a 1997 Annie Award for Best Animated Short Subject.

Live performances
The track was performed during the Post Tour. In support of the release of Post the song was performed on the television show The White Room in 1995, and on the Spanish television show Zona Franca in 1996, to promote the later single release. It was also notably performed on TFI Friday on 19 April 1996, with Howie Bernstein and the TFI Friday House Brass. This performance was later featured on the Post Live album.

Having not been performed live in over a decade, the song would later be performed during the Volta Tour with the Icelandic "Wonderbrass" brass section, sometimes also with fellow Sugarcubes vocalist Einar Örn on trumpet.

Track listing
 United Kingdom CD1
 "I Miss You" – 4:02
 "I Miss You" (Dobie's Rub Part Two – It's a Hip-Hop Thing) – 5:39
 "I Miss You" (Underwater Mix) – 9:30
 "Karvel" – 4:28

 United Kingdom CD2
 "I Miss You" (Dobie's Rub Part One – Sunshine Mix) – 5:33
 "Hyperballad" (3am Mix) – 4:16
 "Violently Happy" (live) – 6:17
 "Headphones" (Ø Remix) – 6:16

 European CD
 "I Miss You" – 4:02
 "Karvel" – 4:28
 "I Miss You" (Photek Mix) – 5:53
 "I Miss You" (Dobie's Rub Part Two – It's a Hip-Hop Thing) – 5:39

Remixes

Dobie Mixes
 "I Miss You" (Dobie Rub Part One – Sunshine Mix) – 5:33
 "I Miss You" (Dobie Rub Part Two – It's a Hip Hop Thing) – 5:39

Darren Emerson Mix
 "I Miss You" (Underwater Mix) – 6:17

Photek Mix
 "I Miss You" (Photek Mix) – 5:53

R.H. Factor Mixes
 "I Miss You" (R.H. Factor Lovely Mix) – 6:35
 "I Miss You" (R.H. Factor Ugly Mix)  – 8:32
 "I Miss You" (R.H. Factor Beats) – 4:33
 "I Miss You" (R.H. Factor Radio Edit) – 3:25

Junior Vasquez Mix (Unreleased)
 "I Miss You" (Junior Vasquez Remix)

Charts

References

External links
 List of "I Miss You" releases
 Lyrics of "I Miss You"

1997 singles
Björk songs
One Little Indian Records singles
Song recordings produced by Björk
Songs written by Björk